= Ignacio Pena Del Rio =

Spanish-American criminal

- Born: Ignacio Peña Del Río
- Other names: Roberto Caveda; Nick Stevens; John Matthew Emerson; Gonzalo Marques de Montpellier; Richard; Blancy Gallo; Giulliano; Ricardo Rey; Kevin; Carlo Montana; Anthony Johns
- Criminal charges: First degree burglary, receiving stolen property and attempted escape
- Criminal penalty: 7 years and 4 months

Ignacio Pena Del Rio (Spanish: Ignacio Peña Del Río) was a notorious cat burglar, forger and martial artist who was nicknamed the James Bond of the cat burglars due to the sophisticated tools and techniques that he used in some of his crimes. He was responsible for over 1000 burglaries in California, making him one of the U.S.'s most notorious and prolific cat burglars. He stole more than 18 million dollars in jewelry and art and he surprised the public and achieved notoriety after he agreed to teach some of his techniques to Law enforcement agencies in a 70-minute training video and after he drew a map from his prison cell that led authorities to a buried treasure in the San Fernando Valley in California which contained millions of dollars in jewelry.

== Early life and criminal career ==
Ignacio Pena Del Rio was raised in Spain where from an early age could pass exams with little effort and where he started to practice high risk sports such as martial arts, kick boxing, surfing, climbing and motorcycle racing, although he never used his knowledge in an aggressive mode, only to defend himself. He was known for exalting on anything that he focused due to his intelligence and natural skills. Detectives investigating his case believed that these attributes led him to excel in his criminal activities which he exercised for the adrenaline and excitement that they brought with them and not due to necessity.

He migrated to the United States to compete in martial arts and to attend the University of San Diego where he obtained a degree in business administration, but soon he joined a band of itinerant thieves with whom he participated in several burglaries. Not long after this Ignacio left the band as he wanted to target richer neighborhoods and he started to develop his own techniques that included the use of sophisticated tools for some of his burglaries as well as equipment to create visas, passports, driver licenses and different type of identifications that he used to change names with frequency. During his criminal career he used over 35 different identities. It was also during this time that he taught himself how to open safes and how to defeat alarm systems.

During his career he was pursued by the FBI who would finally got its first break after some of his loot was discovered when by mistake a room in a storage facility in the San Fernando Valley was opened and millions of dollars in jewelry and art were discovered. The loot contained a Degas painting valued at 10 million dollars, millions of dollars in jewelry, an arsenal of guns and many other stolen valuables. Soon after the discovery the guns were transferred to the Bureau of Alcohol, Tobacco, Firearms and Explosives (ATF) and the stolen items to the police department who after a thorough investigation was able to get a break in the cases that were looming in the Southern California area. This led to the arrest of Ignacio in February 2006 who was apprehended using the name of Roberto Caveda. He was found guilty of six counts each of first-degree burglary, nine counts each of receiving stolen property and one count of attempting to escape from custody.

From prison he agreed to participate in a training video for Law enforcement agencies and in addition he drew a map which led the police to a place where he had buried some of his loot. For his participation in the creation of this training video for Law enforcement agencies and for leading authorities to this hidden treasure, Ignacio got a reduction of time of one third of his sentence.
